Frenchman's Cay is an island of the British Virgin Islands in the Caribbean. Frenchman's Cay is connected to the main island of Tortola by a very short bridge to Tortola's West end. Frenchman's Cay has a number of houses, two restaurants, a marina, and a hotel on it. The hotel is called Frenchman's Hotel and is actually a resort complex on the island. 

Islands of the British Virgin Islands